Sini is a comune (municipality) in the Province of Oristano in the Italian region Sardinia, located about  northwest of Cagliari and about  southeast of Oristano.

Sini borders the following municipalities: Baradili, Genoni, Genuri, Gonnosnò.

Demographic evolution

References

Cities and towns in Sardinia